Sara Beth Bareilles (born December 7, 1979) is an American singer and songwriter. She has sold over three million albums and over 15 million singles in the United States. She has earned various accolades, including two Grammy Awards, as well as nominations for three Primetime Emmy Awards, and two Tony Awards. In February 2012, VH1 named her one of the Top 100 Greatest Women in Music.

Born and raised in Eureka, California, Bareilles released a self-published album Careful Confessions in 2004. She received further recognition with the release of her second studio album Little Voice (2007), which was her first recording for a major record label (Epic). The album included the hit single "Love Song", which reached number four on the Billboard Hot 100 and earned her a nomination for the Grammy Award for Song of the Year. In 2010, she released her third studio album Kaleidoscope Heart, which peaked at number one on the Billboard 200. In 2013, she released her fourth studio album The Blessed Unrest which featured the lead single "Brave". It received a nomination for the Grammy Award for Album of the Year.

Bareilles made her Broadway debut when she composed music and wrote lyrics for the 2015 musical Waitress, for which she earned nominations for the Tony Award for Best Original Score and the Grammy Award for Best Musical Theater Album. She subsequently received Olivier Award nominations for its 2021 West End transfer production. She released the 2015 studio album What's Inside: Songs from Waitress, which is a recording of her singing many of the musical's songs. For her work in the 2016 Broadway musical SpongeBob SquarePants, she earned a Tony Award nomination. In 2019, she released her sixth studio album Amidst the Chaos, with the single "Saint Honesty" winning her the Grammy Award for Best American Roots Performance. In 2022, she returned to Broadway as The Baker's Wife in a revival of Stephen Sondheim's Into the Woods, earning a second Grammy Award.

Bareilles is also known for her work on television. In 2018, she received critical acclaim for her portrayal of Mary Magdalene in the NBC musical television special Jesus Christ Superstar Live in Concert, for which she was nominated for the Primetime Emmy Award for Outstanding Supporting Actress in a Limited Series or Movie. Also in 2018, she co-hosted the 72nd Tony Awards alongside Josh Groban, for which she gathered two further Primetime Emmy Award nominations. She currently stars as Dawn Solano in Peacock's musical comedy Girls5eva (2021–present).

Early life
Bareilles was born and raised in Eureka, Humboldt County, California, one of three daughters of Bonnie Halvorsen (née Capellas), a funeral home worker, and Paul Bareilles, an insurance adjuster. She has two sisters, Stacey and Jennifer, and a half-sister, Melody. She is of Italian, English, German, Portuguese, and French descent; her last name Bareilles is French. She speaks some Italian and lived in Bologna, Italy for a year during college. Bareilles was raised Catholic, and attended parochial school until junior high, when she transferred to public school. She participated in the high school choir, Limited Edition, and local community theater musical productions, including her high school's production of Little Shop of Horrors, in which she appeared as Audrey.

After graduating from Eureka High School in 1998, Bareilles studied communication studies at the University of California, Los Angeles, where she was a member of the co-ed a cappella group Awaken a Cappella; she can be heard on their album Dysfunktional Family, singing her original selection "Gravity" and "I Want You Back" by The Jackson 5. The group's rendition of Bareilles' "Gravity" was featured on the Best of College a Cappella 2004 compilation CD. Bareilles and the band Maroon 5 have been acquainted since their college days at UCLA, when the band was known as Kara's Flowers. She performed in the annual student concert UCLA Spring Sing, winning twice. Bareilles taught herself to play multiple instruments, including the piano.

Career

2002–2006: Career beginnings and Careful Confessions
After graduating from UCLA in 2002, Bareilles performed at local bars and clubs (such as the Hotel Café and Genghis Cohen in Los Angeles), building a following before performing in larger venues. She released two demos of mostly live tracks in 2003: The First One in April and The Summer Sessions in October.

In January 2004, Bareilles released her first studio album, Careful Confessions. In mid-2004, she opened for Rocco DeLuca and the Burden during their inaugural headline tour, supported Guster on their first UK tour and co-headlined a tour with Jon McLaughlin. Also in 2004, she appeared as a singer in a bar in the award-winning indie film Girl Play, performing the song "Undertow" and her songs "Gravity" and "Fairy Tale" also appeared in the film.

She signed a contract with Epic Records on April 15, 2005 and spent the rest of the year and the early months of 2006 writing, composing and reworking songs for her upcoming album.

She was the opening act in 2006 for Marc Broussard's "Carencro" tour. Her song "Gravity" appeared briefly in the 2006 independent film Loving Annabelle.

In 2007, Bareilles toured as the opening act for Aqualung and Mika and later that year opened for several shows on both Maroon 5 and Paolo Nutini's U.S. tours. She opened for James Blunt on his U.S. tour in association with VH1 You Oughta Know.

2007–2008: Breakthrough with Little Voice

In June 2007, iTunes featured Bareilles's single "Love Song" as the free single of the week. The song documents her frustration with the pressures of meeting the demands of Epic Records in creating her first album, though there was no specific request to write a "love song". In fact, the bulk of the songs on her major label debut -- Little Voice—were improved versions of songs from Careful Confessions.

In July 2007 Little Voice shot to No. 1 on the list of most downloaded albums of the music store in its first week of release, and debuted at No. 45 on the Billboard 200 chart. After being featured on a Rhapsody commercial in 2007, "Love Song" began climbing the pop charts, jumping from No. 73 to No. 16 in one week. It entered the top 10 on the Billboard Hot 100 on December 27, 2007, and peaked at No. 4. On other charts, such as the Pop 100 and Hot AC, "Love Song" hit No. 1. Bareilles performed the song on The Tonight Show with Jay Leno on Thursday, January 17, 2008, and on the Today show on Thursday, February 21, 2008. Soon after that, the song entered the UK Singles Chart, peaking at No. 4. The music video was directed by Josh Forbes, and it starred the British actor Adam Campbell.

As of 2010, Little Voice had been certified platinum by the RIAA. The album peaked in the Billboard 200 at No. 7, and the UK Top 40 at No. 9. Its breakthrough single, "Love Song", was later certified triple platinum.

On October 28, 2008, Bareilles released Between the Lines: Sara Bareilles Live at the Fillmore on DVD and CD. The package is a recording of her first headlining tour at The Fillmore in San Francisco. This package also included live recordings of her unreleased song "August Moon", as well as a cover of Otis Redding's "(Sittin' On) The Dock of the Bay". She concluded the tour in her home town of Eureka, California, on December 19, 2008, at the Arkley Center for the Performing Arts.

She toured with Counting Crows and Maroon 5 between July 25 and August 26, 2008. The first stop was Virginia Beach, Virginia, and the last stop Cuyahoga Falls, Ohio. Bareilles was selected as MTV artist of the week for July 7–11 and appeared again on The Tonight Show with Jay Leno on Wednesday, July 9, 2008; and on December 9, 2008 (with Ingrid Michaelson).

During the spring of 2009, Bareilles was on her second headlining tour, the Gravity Tour, to promote "Gravity", the third and final single from her album Little Voice. She made her third appearance in Charlottesville, Virginia, during the University of Virginia's annual Springfest on March 28, her first as the opener for Marc Broussard in 2005 and the second being an opening act for Maroon 5. Bareilles also played multiple college shows in April and May. Some were for college students only and others were open to the public.

She sent out a special holiday message to fans on her mailing list and gave out a free live acoustic EP recorded during her Gravity Tour. The EP contained seven acoustic songs, including a new song "Free Ride", "I'm on Fire" (a Bruce Springsteen cover duet with Tony Lucca), and two speaking segments.

In early 2010, Bareilles recorded video of what she called "An Ode to Jersey Shore" and posted it to her official website as a gag for fans.

2009–2012: Kaleidoscope Heart and The Sing-Off

Exhausted by her rise to stardom and daunted at the prospect of writing another major hit—as documented in her song "Uncharted"—Bareilles experienced a period of writer's block, where she came to fear she would never write another song. She began work on the follow-up to her major label debut in the summer of 2009, collaborating with the likes of Ahmir "Questlove" Thompson, members of Weezer, and Pharrell Williams. As new songs began to take shape, Neal Avron was assigned to produce, record, and mix the entire album. Titled Kaleidoscope Heart, the album was recorded at The Village Recorder and Sunset Sound in Los Angeles.

The first single from Kaleidoscope Heart, "King of Anything", began receiving radio airplay in the United States in May 2010, and was released for sale in June. "King of Anything" had its first play on British radio airwaves on Paul Kay's "Album Download" show on Mid-Wales commercial radio station "Radio Maldwyn – The Magic 756" in August 2010. "King of Anything" was later certified platinum by the RIAA.

In anticipation of the new album, Bareilles released a series of webisodes, featuring the making of select songs from Kaleidoscope Heart, including "King of Anything", "Uncharted", "Gonna Get Over You", "Bluebird", and a strings-only version of "King of Anything". The first webisode also contains Bareilles writing the chorus/refrain lyrics for "Hold My Heart". She was selected as VH1's Posted Artist of the Month for July 2010, chronicling her life leading up to the album's release.

Kaleidoscope Heart was released on September 7, 2010, and debuted at number 1 in the United States, selling 90,000 copies. Her previous album, Little Voice, re-entered the charts at number 200 in the same week, bookending the charts.

Bareilles toured in support of Kaleidoscope Heart from September to December 2010, with most of the shows being sold out. Bareilles toured Europe and parts of Asia and Australia with Maroon 5 throughout spring 2011. She embarked on a small headline tour in April 2011 with openers Elizabeth & the Catapult and Ximena Sariñana in support of the second single from Kaleidoscope Heart, "Uncharted", which concluded April 23, 2011 in Memphis, Tennessee. She also opened select shows for the country music duo Sugarland on their Summer 2011 Incredible Machine Tour. The third and final single released from Kaleidoscope Heart is "Gonna Get Over You", with a music video directed by Jonah Hill.

Bareilles was added in the third season of the NBC television series The Sing-Off as a celebrity judge following the departure of Nicole Scherzinger, alongside Ben Folds and Shawn Stockman of Boyz II Men. Bareilles also guest-starred on Bucket & Skinner's Epic Adventures.

On August 13, 2011, the Hoosier Lottery Grandstand stage at the Indiana State Fair collapsed right after Bareilles finished performing as the opening act for Sugarland. She was uninjured, tweeting, "I'm speechless and feel so helpless; my heart aches for the lives lost." Seven people were killed, and more than 45 injured, in the collapse.

2012–2014: Once Upon Another Time and The Blessed Unrest
Soon after joining The Sing-Off, Bareilles announced she was in the process of recording a new EP, with co-star Ben Folds producing it. She also collaborated with fellow singer songwriters Greg Laswell and Jon McLaughlin on their new singles in February. In March, she was slated to release A Trace of Sun, a documentary of the time she had spent volunteering in Japan after the 2011 Tohoku earthquake. Her EP, Once Upon Another Time, was released on 22 May and contained 5 new recordings. The first and only single from the EP, "Stay", was released on April 21, 2012, on 7" vinyl, exclusive to Record Store Day participants with a vinyl-only B-side, "Beautiful Girl".

During her Stageit show on September 10, 2012, Bareilles stated that she was working on a new record in New York. She also premiered a new song which might be appearing on the new album in question, which was titled "Only Shadows". In January 2013, she revealed the plans for what was to come later in the year. After moving to New York, Bareilles finished her record, and released the lead single from that album "soon" thereafter. In January, Bareilles was a featured artist of the a cappella group Straight No Chaser on the Jackson 5 song, "I Want You Back" which premiered on Billboard.

In February 2013, Bareilles began teasing her fans to her upcoming album through her Twitter and YouTube accounts. The first tease was a video she released on her website, titled "Sara is Making a Record...".

On March 27, 2013, Bareilles announced that she would conduct an 18-city tour to promote the new album. The first single, "Brave", was released digitally on April 23. On April 17, 2013, Bareilles released a lyric video for her single "Brave" on YouTube. The album she had been teasing, finally titled The Blessed Unrest, was eventually released on July 16, 2013.

Bareilles performed two songs for the feature film Bounty Killer, which was released in September 2013. The first, titled "The Kill", was written and composed by Will Collyer and Sujata Day. The second, titled "Gonna Getcha", was written and composed by Will Collyer and the film's director, Henry Saine.

Her live album, Brave Enough: Live at the Variety Playhouse, was released on October 22, 2013. The concert was recorded at the Variety Playhouse in Atlanta, Georgia.

In October 2013, two nurses from University of Minnesota Amplatz Children's Hospital Brittany Bloemke and Natalie Snyder, along with former patient Sarah Ewald, produced a YouTube video containing coworkers and young cancer patients dancing and singing to Bareilles's song "Brave". As of August 2019, it had over 1.6 million views. On October 31, 2013, while the trio were being interviewed by host Nischelle Turner on the HLN show Showbiz Tonight, Bareilles surprised them by Skyping into the interview. Of the video, she said: "I was sent this video by a friend of a friend who lives in Minnesota, and I watched it late at night and immediately my eyes welled up with tears. It's moments like this that remind me of the importance of music, and I can't think of a more perfect incarnation of this song. It's exactly the kind of thing that gives the life to this song that we were hoping for." On October 16, 2019, she visited the hospital before her show at the Xcel Energy Center to sing the song with them live.

On January 26, 2014, Bareilles performed a duet with Carole King at the 56th Annual Grammy Awards. The pair performed renditions of King's "Beautiful" and Bareilles's "Brave".

On April 28, 2014, Bareilles performed with Elton John at The Breast Cancer Research Foundation's Annual Hot Pink Party Fundraiser. In May, Bareilles recorded a cover of Jackie Wilson's song "(Your Love Keeps Lifting Me) Higher and Higher" for the Oprah Winfrey Network.

Bareilles toured 24 American cities between July 10, 2014, and August 14, 2014, in her "The Little Black Dress Summer Tour". The tour supported her album The Blessed Unrest, and it featured opening performances by at least three "special guests": American singer Emily King, indie pop band Lucius, and Canadian singer Hannah Georgas.

Bareilles sang "Smile" during the "In Memoriam" segment of the 66th Primetime Emmy Awards show on August 25, 2014.

2015–2017: Waitress, Sounds Like Me, and What's Inside

In June 2013, it was reported that Bareilles was to score Waitress, a musical adaptation of the 2007 film of the same title. The musical opened on August 20, 2015, produced by the American Repertory Theater. The production was directed by Diane Paulus, and it starred Jessie Mueller in the leading role. Bareilles debuted a song from the musical, "She Used to Be Mine", during some shows on her Little Black Dress Tour. On July 16, 2019, it was announced that Waitress would end its run on Broadway on January 5, 2020.

On October 25, 2012, Simon & Schuster announced it would publish a book written by Bareilles, containing essays and photos. The book was tentatively set for release in 2014; however, Bareilles finished the book in March 2015. The title, Sounds Like Me: My Life (So Far) in Song, was announced in April 2015, and released on October 6, 2015.

Bareilles began work on her fifth studio album, What's Inside: Songs from Waitress, in April 2015 at New York City's Electric Lady Studios, in collaboration with producer Neal Avron, who had previously worked with Bareilles on Kaleidoscope Heart. In June 2015, Bareilles confirmed during a Google Hangouts Q & A session that the album would feature songs she had written and composed for Waitress, which would be reworked "to sound like Sara Bareilles songs." On June 27, 2015, Bareilles and Nadia DiGiallonardo performed "She Used to Be Mine", the album's lead single, with Rich Dworsky and The Berkshire Boys on humorist Garrison Keillor's National Public Radio show A Prairie Home Companion. The album was released on November 6, 2015, through Epic Records.

In June 2016, Bareilles performed the part of Ariel in a two-night live presentation of Disney's The Little Mermaid at the Hollywood Bowl. She performed the Joni Mitchell song "Both Sides, Now" during the In Memoriam homage at the 89th Academy Awards in February 2017.

On March 31, 2017, Bareilles took to the Broadway stage in the role of Jenna Hunterson in Waitress for a 10-week engagement. She would return to the role in January 2018 for a six-week run, including two weeks co-starring with friend and fellow musician Jason Mraz as Dr. Pomatter. Mraz had previously duetted with Bareilles on two songs featuring the Pomatter part on the What's Inside album. She returned to the role again in January 2019, for a four-week run opposite Gavin Creel as Dr. Pomatter.

2018–present: Amidst the Chaos, Into the Woods, and television projects
On April 1, 2018, Bareilles portrayed Mary Magdalene in Jesus Christ Superstar Live in Concert, NBC's stripped-down "concert" adaptation of Andrew Lloyd Webber and Tim Rice's first full stage musical. Bareilles was well received in the role by fans and critics and was nominated for the 2018 Primetime Emmy Award for Outstanding Supporting Actress in a Limited Series or Movie. and the 2019 Grammy Award for Best Musical Theatre Album.

On June 10, 2018, Bareilles hosted the 72nd Tony Awards with Josh Groban. She and Groban performed the opening number to the show, "This One's for You", which was an ode to those who would not win an award that night and referencing that neither had won a major award before, particularly noting the Grammy Awards. They also performed three other numbers, a medley tribute to Chita Rivera and Andrew Lloyd Webber, "8 Times a Week" (a parody of "Chandelier" by Sia), and "This One's for the Dreamers". Bareilles was one of the composers who were nominated for the 2018 Tony Award for Best Original Score for SpongeBob SquarePants. She was nominated for two Primetime Emmy Awards for Outstanding Variety Special and Outstanding Original Music and Lyrics for "This One's for You" for her work at the 72nd Tony Awards.

In August 2018, it was announced that Waitress would premiere at the Adelphi Theatre in London's West End in February 2019.

In early 2017, Bareilles announced that she was working on a new album to be released by the end of 2018. The new album's first single, "Armor", was released on October 26, 2018. The same day, pre-orders for the new album were made available through the PledgeMusic direct-to-fan platform with an updated release target of Spring 2019. On February 13, 2019, Bareilles announced the title of her sixth album will be Amidst the Chaos. On April 6, 2019, the album debuted at number six on the Billboard 200 with 35,000 equivalent album sales, of which 29,000 were pure sales. She also released "Shiny", a song about "wanting moms to see how special they really are," on May 10, 2019, to coincide with Mother's Day.

On January 27, 2020, Bareilles made her West End debut, as Jenna Hunterson in Waitress at the Adelphi Theatre, opposite Gavin Creel as Dr. Pomatter. Bareilles was set to have a limited eight-week run to end on March 21, but performed her last show on March 14 and returned to the United States due to international travel restrictions related to the coronavirus outbreak. Bareilles also won the Grammy Award for Best American Roots Performance for the song "Saint Honesty" from her album Amidst the Chaos on January 27, 2020.

On March 25, 2019, Bareilles appeared on stage at an Apple event to announce that she, along with J. J. Abrams and Waitress collaborator Jessie Nelson, had developed a series for Apple TV+ entitled Little Voice, for which she had also recorded the theme song. Bareilles and Nelson collaborated on music for the series, which premiered on Apple TV+ on July 10, 2020. On September 4, 2020, Bareilles released an album titled More Love: Songs from Little Voice Season One with her own recordings of songs from the series.

On August 10, 2020, Bareilles was announced to star in Peacock's new musical comedy Girls5eva, created by Meredith Scardino and executive produced by Tina Fey and Robert Carlock. On May 6, 2021, all eight episodes of the first season of Girls5eva were released on Peacock.

On May 5, 2021, it was announced that Bareilles would reprise her role as Jenna in a limited revival production of Waitress following the reopening of Broadway theatres. The show opened at the Ethel Barrymore Theatre on September 2, 2021, with Bareilles playing the role through October 17.

In May 2022, Bareilles starred as the Baker's Wife in the Encores! production of Into the Woods at the New York City Center. She reprised the role in a Broadway revival at the St. James Theatre through September 4, 2022. She starred opposite Creel, Brian d'Arcy James, Joshua Henry, Phillipa Soo, Patina Miller, and Cheyenne Jackson.

Artistry

Musical style and influences
In her book Sounds Like Me, Bareilles tells of the conflicting feedback she received on her way to winning a recording contract. Some prospective labels gave her the feedback that her voice was great, but she needed better songs; others told her that the songs were great, but her singing wasn't up to par. This experience was portrayed in the series Little Voice.

Bareilles is known for her strong mezzo-soprano vocal range. She is often compared to artists such as Regina Spektor, Fiona Apple and Billy Joel, due to her vocal ability and incorporation of piano into her music.

She has described her sound as "piano-based pop soul", with Bareilles finding inspiration from singers such as Etta James and Sam Cooke.

In an interview for The Huffington Post, Bareilles explained that writing and releasing one of her earliest singles, "Love Song", posed as a defining moment for her music career, since she was "fighting for the essence of some truth inside [of her], which to [her was] a beautiful love song."

She is often praised for her songwriting abilities, with critics stating she "conveys vulnerability and wisdom in lyrics that speak honestly about relationships from a woman's point of view", and that her "writing voice is uniquely her own".

Band members

Bareilles's first band consisted of these members aside from Bareilles herself:
 Javier Dunn– guitar and vocals
 Daniel Rhine– bass guitar
 Josh Day– drums, percussion and backing vocals
Other musicians who have toured with her as part of her band include Eric Robinson (guitar and keys), Holly Conlan (backing vocals), Steve Goold (drums, percussion) and Philip Krohnengold (guitar and keyboards).

In 2013, Bareilles parted amicably with her longtime bandmates to "move in a new direction". She subsequently embarked on a short solo tour named Brave Enough, before forming a new band in anticipation of her fall co-headlining tour with OneRepublic. The new band consists of these personnel aside from Bareilles herself:
 Rich Hinman– guitar
 Steve Goold– drums, percussion
 Chris Morrissey– bass guitar
 Cara Fox and Christina Courtin– strings
 Misty Boyce– keyboards

Collaborations with other artists

In December 2008, a single Bareilles had performed in collaboration with Ingrid Michaelson, titled Winter Song, was released from the compilation The Hotel Cafe Presents Winter Songs. Bareilles and Michaelson performed it on The Tonight Show with Jay Leno, and an animated video was released. In December 2011, Winter Song reached number 2 on the Irish Singles Chart. She also recorded the song Come Home, a duet with OneRepublic, which was released on iTunes on July 14, 2009.

Bareilles was one of many singers to appear in the season 3 finale of 30 Rock, including Mary J. Blige, Rachael Yamagata, Sheryl Crow, Norah Jones, and Elvis Costello. The episode was a parody of We Are The World-style rockstar fundraisers, with the group recording an impassioned plea for a kidney donation, specifically to help selfish character Jack Donaghy's newly discovered genetic father, played by Alan Alda.

Bareilles appeared with Weezer on Jimmy Kimmel Live and as an AOL Sessions guest, performing (If You're Wondering If I Want You To) I Want You To, as well for a special performance on YouTube.

She has performed for the First Family numerous times: 
 Bareilles was first invited by First Lady Michelle Obama to play at the G-20 Summit in Pittsburgh in September 2009. Here she performed songs for the First Ladies of 20 nations and afterward dined with Michelle Obama. 
 The Obamas again invited her to perform at the Easter Egg Roll in 2010. 
 On October 20, 2010, it was announced that Bareilles would open for President Obama at a Las Vegas rally for the Democratic midterm elections. 
 In December 2010, Bareilles and fellow singer Ingrid Michaelson performed Winter Song for the Obamas and many spectators at the National Christmas Tree Lighting.

In 2011, as pop rock band Maroon 5 was touring in promotion for their Hands All Over album, Bareilles contributed to the female vocals (originally belonging to Lady Antebellum) for the song Out of Goodbyes.

She appeared with the band Sugarland for a cover of Dexys (Midnight Runners)'s Come on Eileen in a YouTube exclusive.

In December 2010, Bareilles appeared on the second-season finale of The Sing-Off to sing King of Anything with The Backbeats. She joined The Sing-Off as a judge in its third season alongside musicians Ben Folds and Shawn Stockman (of Boyz II Men). She and Folds sang the Frank Loesser classic Baby, It's Cold Outside on a Christmas-themed episode of the show in December 2011. Folds later produced, played on, and provided backing vocals on Bareilles' 2012 EP Once Upon Another Time, and also provided the forward to her 2015 book, Sounds Like Me: My Life (So Far) In Song.

She performed the duet Love Won't Let You Get Away with Seth MacFarlane on his debut studio album, Music Is Better Than Words, and reunited to perform the song with him at Club Nokia on March 26, 2011.

Bareilles was featured on the track titled Mango Tree, from the Zac Brown Band album titled Jekyll + Hyde, which was released on April 28, 2015.  The song title was originally released under the title Christmas Tree.

Bareilles was featured on Summer is Over, the first single from Jon McLaughlin's third studio album, Promising Promises, a re-issue of his self-released album Forever If Ever. McLaughlin released the selection in January 2012.

MacFarlane's Christmas album Holiday for Swing, released on September 30, 2014, would also feature Bareilles. She joined him on another rendition of Baby, It's Cold Outside. The album, which also featured collaborations with Norah Jones and Frank Sinatra's bassist Chuck Berghoffer as well as a 65-piece orchestra, was recorded at Abbey Road Studios in London.

Bareilles collaborated with Folds again in January 2018 at The Kennedy Center for his DECLASSIFIED: Ben Folds Presents concert series with the National Symphony Orchestra. Joined by violinist, singer, and Pulitzer Prize-winning composer Caroline Shaw, the orchestra performed classical music, modern compositions by Shaw, and five of Bareilles's songs, including She Used to Be Mine from Waitress. Shaw and Dominic Mekky would arrange the orchestral parts for a performance of Love Song. Shaw and Folds joined the orchestra, on vocals and percussion respectively, to back Bareilles on Brave. She, Folds, and Shaw harmonized together on Once Upon Another Time.

Personal life
Bareilles was in a relationship with former band member and guitarist Javier Dunn until 2013. In August 2015, she met actor Joe Tippett during an out-of-town tryout for Waitress at the American Repertory Theater in Cambridge, Massachusetts, and they later began a relationship. The couple made their first public appearance at the Tony Awards two years later. On New Year's Day in 2023, Bareilles and Tippett announced their engagement. Tippett has appeared in productions of Waitress as well as on the television series The Morning Show and Mare of Easttown.

Bareilles considers herself "definitely sort of a feminist", saying, "I don't think that being a feminist has anything to do with hating anything. It's about celebrating women and being productive for females. I'm not one for seeing amazing, intelligent women being reduced to sex symbols." Bareilles has been a longtime ally of the LGBTQ+ community and cites her song "Brave" as being inspired by her friend's struggle with coming out.

Discography

Studio albums
 Careful Confessions (2004)
 Little Voice (2007)
 Kaleidoscope Heart (2010)
 The Blessed Unrest (2013)
 What's Inside: Songs from Waitress (2015)
 Amidst the Chaos (2019)

Soundtrack albums
 More Love: Songs from Little Voice Season One (2020)
 Girls5eva: Music from the Peacock Original Series (2021)
 Girls5eva: Season 2 (Original Series Soundtrack) (2022)
 Into the Woods (2022 Broadway Cast Recording) (2022)

Filmography

Film

Television

Theatre

Awards and nominations

References

External links

 
 
 
 
 
 
 

 
1979 births
21st-century American actresses
21st-century American guitarists
21st-century American women guitarists
21st-century American women singers
Actresses from Los Angeles
American women pop singers
American women rock singers
American women singer-songwriters
American feminists
American film actresses
American mezzo-sopranos
American musical theatre actresses
American musical theatre composers
American people of English descent
American people of French descent
American people of German descent
American people of Italian descent
American people of Portuguese descent
American pop pianists
American pop rock singers
American rock pianists
American rock songwriters
American soul singers
American stage actresses
American television actresses
American women pianists
Broadway composers and lyricists
Catholics from California
Epic Records artists
Women musical theatre composers
Feminist musicians
Grammy Award winners
Guitarists from Los Angeles
Living people
People from Eureka, California
Singer-songwriters from California
Singers from Los Angeles
University of California, Los Angeles alumni
Judges in American reality television series